Bringing Up Baby may refer to:
Bringing Up Baby, a 1938 film directed by Howard Hawks
"Bringing Up Baby" (Modern Family), an episode of the television series Modern Family
Bringing Up Baby (TV programme), the British television documentary series